The 2008-09 Biathlon World Cup/World Cup 3 was the second event of the season that was held in Hochfilzen, Austria. This leg was originally planned to be held in Pokljuka, Slovenia but was set to Hochfilzen due to unfinished reconstructions. From Thursday December 18 until Sunday December 21, 2008.

Schedule of events
The schedule of the event is below.

Medal winners

Men

Women

References

Biathlon World Cup - World Cup 3, 2008-09
2008 in Austrian sport
Biathlon competitions in Austria
Sport in Tyrol (state)
December 2008 sports events in Europe